"Schlaf, Kindlein, schlaf" ("Sleep, dear child, sleep") is a German lullaby.

The oldest surviving version is a text and melody fragment of the first stanza, which appears in 1611 as part of a quodlibet in Melchior Franck's Fasciculus quodlibeticus. The current melody of the lullaby was composed by Johann Friedrich Reichardt in 1781 after a folk tune and also used for "" (cockchafer fly). The currently known text version was distributed by the third volume of the collection Des Knaben Wunderhorn (1808). As a template for the first stanza was a Low German version of Johann Friedrich Schütze's Holstein Idioticon (1806), the other stanzas are added poetry of Clemens Brentano. Franz Magnus Böhme reprinted 36 text variants in 1897.

Johannes Brahms set the text to his own music as No. 11 in his collection 15 Volkskinderlieder, WoO 31 (1857).

Melody 
The melody by Johann Friedrich Reichardt is from 1781.

Text 
Schlaf, Kindlein, schlaf,
Der Vater hüt die Schaf,
Die Mutter schüttelts Bäumelein,
Da fällt herab ein Träumelein,
Schlaf, Kindlein, schlaf.

Schlaf, Kindlein, schlaf,
Am Himmel ziehn die Schaf,
Die Sternlein sind die Lämmerlein,
Der Mond der ist das Schäferlein,
Schlaf, Kindlein, schlaf.

Schlaf, Kindlein, schlaf,
Christkindlein hat ein Schaf,
Ist selbst das liebe Gotteslamm,
Das um uns all zu Tode kam,
Schlaf, Kindlein, schlaf!

Schlaf, Kindlein, schlaf,
So schenk ich dir ein Schaf
Mit einer goldnen Schelle fein,
Das soll dein Spielgeselle sein,
Schlaf, Kindlein, schlaf!

Schlaf, Kindlein, schlaf,
Und blöck nicht wie ein Schaf,
Sonst kömmt des Schäfers Hündelein,
Und beißt mein böses Kindelein,
Schlaf, Kindlein, schlaf.

Schlaf, Kindlein, schlaf,
Geh fort und hüt die Schaf,
Geh fort du schwarzes Hündelein,
Und weck mir nicht mein Kindelein,
Schlaf, Kindlein, schlaf.
Sleep my child, sleep
Your father tends the sheep,
Your mother shakes the apple tree,
As falls down a dream for thee
Sleep my child, sleep

Sleep, my child, sleep
In the sky there drag the sheep
The shepherd, he is like the moon
In the sky with lambs bestrewn
Sleep my child, sleep

Sleep my child, sleep
Christ child has a sheep,
Your beloved mother shears the ram
to make fine clothes for madame
Sleep, my child, sleep

Sleep, my child, sleep
then I will give you a lamb
with the finest golden clamp
which will be your playmate then
Sleep, my child, sleep

Sleep, my child sleep
Don't bleat like a sheep
or else there'll come the shepherd's dog
and bites my little child so bad
Sleep, my child, sleep

Sleep, my child, sleep
Go away and tend the sheep
Go away you black dog, so mad
and leave alone my little brat
Sleep, my child, sleep

Sleep, my child, sleep
out there walks a sheep
but now its time for beddy-byes
so come on, my child close your eyes
Sleep, my child, sleep.

References

External links

Lullabies
German poems
German folk songs
German-language songs
German children's songs
Traditional children's songs